Taarbæk Idrætsforening (Taarbæk I.F., TIF) is a minor football club from Taarbæk, Denmark. The club was founded August 23, 1908 and is among the oldest Danish football clubs. The first team is playing in the serie 2, the seventh highest Danish league. The club plays its home games at the Springforbi football ground just north from Taarbæk City. The club competed in the 1969 and 1994 Danish Cup tournaments.

Taarbæk IF Hall of fame

Presidents 
The president of the club is elected every odd year.

References

External links 
 Official page of Taarbæk IF
 Taarbæk IFs anniversary website
 Taarbæk IF at Danish Football Association

Football clubs in Denmark
Association football clubs established in 1908
1908 establishments in Denmark